Tomás Birkner de Miguel (born 5 March 1997) is an Argentine alpine ski racer. He is the nephew of Jorge Birkner, Magdalena Birkner, Ignacio Birkner, and Carolina Birkner and the cousin of Jorge Birkner Ketelhohn, Cristian Javier Simari Birkner, María Belén Simari Birkner, Macarena Simari Birkner, Bautista Saubidet Birkner, and Francisco Saubidet.

He competed at the 2015 World Championships in Beaver Creek, US, in the slalom.

He competed for Argentina at the 2022 Winter Olympics.

He competes at the collegiate level for the University of Utah.

References

External links
 
 
 
 

1997 births
Living people
Argentine male alpine skiers
Olympic alpine skiers of Argentina
Alpine skiers at the 2022 Winter Olympics